This is a list of singles that peaked in the top ten of the ARIA Charts in 2014.

Top-ten singles

Key

2013 peaks

2015 peaks

Entries by artist
The following table shows artists who achieved two or more top 10 entries in 2014, including songs that reached their peak in 2013 and 2015. The figures include both main artists and featured artists. The total number of weeks an artist spent in the top ten in 2014 is also shown.

See also
2014 in music
ARIA Charts
List of number-one singles of 2014 (Australia)
List of top 25 singles for 2014 in Australia

Notes

References

2014 in Australian music
Australia Top 10
Top 10 singles 2014
Australia 2014